Burlövs egnahem is a locality situated in Burlöv Municipality, Skåne County, Sweden with 554 inhabitants as of 2010.

References 

Populated places in Burlöv Municipality
Populated places in Skåne County